Edmund Barker may refer to:
Edmund Henry Barker (1788–1839), English classical scholar
Edmund W. Barker (1920–2001), Singaporean politician

See also